Vardeh or Verdeh may refer to:
 Vardeh, Alborz
 Vardeh, alternate name of Deh Bal, Kohgiluyeh and Boyer-Ahmad Province
 Verdeh, Markazi
 Vardeh, West Azerbaijan